Riddlesdown Collegiate (formerly Riddlesdown High School) is a secondary school with academy status located in the Riddlesdown area of the London Borough of Croydon, UK. It is a coeducational school, of between 1800 and 2000 students (400 of those being post–16 students). The school takes its pupils mainly from the Sanderstead, Selsdon, Purley, Kenley, New Addington and South Croydon areas, and specialises in science. Riddlesdown is the largest school in Croydon in terms of pupil numbers, and one of the most over-subscribed schools in the area.

History 
Riddlesdown school was built in 1957 and opened in January 1958 as a mixed secondary modern school. In 1971 it converted to comprehensive status, reopening as Riddlesdown High School, and remained a local authority mixed comprehensive school until 31 December 1991 when it was give grant maintained status. In 1996, a Sixth Form Centre was established on the site and Riddlesdown became a voluntary aided school under the Bourne Foundation in 1999.

In September 2009, the school's name changed from Riddlesdown High School to Riddlesdown Collegiate, featuring six colleges; four of which hold a mixture of years 7–11, a Creative Performing Arts college and a Sixth Form college. The school gained Academy status on 1 June 2012.

In 2017, the collegiate was awarded the World-class schools award, one of about 60 in the UK.

Colleges
Each of the six colleges has a distinctive uniform colour variation based on the college colour. Four of the six colleges in the collegiate are 11–16 colleges with another for sixth form (16–19) and a Creative and Performing Arts College.

Ofsted
In a full Section 5 Ofsted inspection in 2016, the school was rated outstanding; however, an initial Section 8 inspection in 2021 suggested that a full inspection might have resulted in a lower rating, necessitating a full inspection next.

Notable alumni 
 Kate Moss, supermodel, 1985–1990
 Rickie Haywood Williams, DJ/broadcaster, 1991–1996
 Nigel Reo-Coker, footballer, 1995–2000
 Klariza Clayton, actress, 2000–2005
 Kieran Gibbs, footballer, 2001–2006

References

Secondary schools in the London Borough of Croydon
Educational institutions established in 1958
1958 establishments in England
Academies in the London Borough of Croydon